Coin edges may be plain (smooth) or patterned, or a combination of both. They can also include lettering.

Reeded edges are often referred to as "ridged" or "grooved" (US usage), or "milled" (UK usage). Some coins, such as United States quarters and dimes, have reeded edges.  Reeding of edges was introduced to prevent  coin clipping and counterfeiting.

The main techniques of coin edging are edge mills of various types, which put a pattern on a smooth edge after a coin and coin mills with edge ring, which pattern the edge at the time when the coin is being milled.

Coin edge patterns

Examples of patterns used on coin edges include:

See also 
 Pearl circle on coins

References

Numismatics